Andrej Nedić (born 16 October 2004) is a Bosnia and Herzegovina tennis player.

Nedić has a career high ATP singles ranking of 1134 achieved on 18 July 2022. He also has a career high ATP doubles ranking of 2092 achieved on 16 May 2022.

Nedić represents Bosnia and Herzegovina at the Davis Cup, where he has a W/L record of 0–1.

References

External links

2004 births
Living people
Bosnia and Herzegovina male tennis players